Jeffrey Glenn Siemon  (born June 2, 1950) is a former professional American football player and an inductee in the College Football Hall of Fame. A middle linebacker, he played eleven seasons in the National Football League (NFL), all with the Minnesota Vikings, and college football at Stanford.

Siemon grew up in Bakersfield, California, and graduated from Bakersfield High School in 1968, where he played quarterback, linebacker, tight end, and center.

Stanford University
Siemon graduated from Stanford University in 1972, where he starred as a middle linebacker on the Indians' famed "Thunder Chickens" defense, playing on two Rose Bowl-winning teams.  He earned the Silver anniversary Dick Butkus award his senior year (1971) as the nation's top linebacker, and the Pop Warner Award as the top senior player on the West Coast. He was inducted to the College Football Hall of Fame in 2006. He is a member of Delta Tau Delta international fraternity.

NFL
Siemon was the tenth overall selection of the 1972 NFL Draft, taken by the Vikings with a pick acquired from the New England Patriots in the trade for Joe Kapp, the Vikings' starting quarterback in Super Bowl IV. Siemon played for the Vikings for 11 seasons, retiring after the strike-shortened 1982 campaign. During that time, he was the starting middle linebacker in four NFC championship games over the course of five years (1973–1977), winning three: 1973, 1974, and 1976, losing one: 1977, and three Super Bowls (VIII, IX, XI), all losses.

He was also a vital part of the Vikings' 1975 season of 12 wins and 2 losses, winning the NFC central division, third in the NFL in fewest points allowed (180 points, 12.9 points per game), but the team lost to the Dallas Cowboys in the first round of the playoffs. During the prime years, he teamed up with excellent outside linebackers, such as Matt Blair, Roy Winston, and Wally Hilgenberg.

Prior to the 1982 season, Siemon was traded to the San Diego Chargers. However, he was cut in training camp by coach Don Coryell and claimed off waivers by the Vikings to back up Scott Studwell. His final NFL season was Minnesota's first in the Hubert H. Humphrey Metrodome.

For his speed, quickness, and savvy, he was chosen to play in four Pro Bowls.

Post-NFL

After his NFL career, Jeff graduated from the Simon Greenleaf School of Law (M.A. in Christian Apologetics, 1984) Subsequently, Jeff began and continues his work today as the Minnesota Search Ministries Division Director.

Jeff and his wife, Dawn, have four grown children and live in Edina, Minnesota. Their daughter Kelley was a four-year starter for the Notre Dame women's basketball team, concluding her career as part of the Fighting Irish's 2001 national championship squad.

External links
 

1950 births
Living people
All-American college football players
American football linebackers
College Football Hall of Fame inductees
Minnesota Vikings players
National Conference Pro Bowl players
Stanford Cardinal football players